Yuriy Prokhorenko (born 9 March 1951) is a Ukrainian former pole vaulter who competed in the 1976 Summer Olympics and in the 1980 Summer Olympics.

References

1951 births
Living people
Ukrainian male pole vaulters
Olympic athletes of the Soviet Union
Athletes (track and field) at the 1976 Summer Olympics
Athletes (track and field) at the 1980 Summer Olympics
Soviet male pole vaulters